Elizabeth Yianni-Georgiou is a British make-up artist. She was nominated for an Academy Award in the category Best Makeup and Hairstyling for the film Guardians of the Galaxy.

Selected filmography 
 Guardians of the Galaxy (2014; co-nominated with David White)
2015 Their Finest 
2016 The Mummy
2019 Rocketman 
2022 Dr Strange & the Universe of Madness
2022 Disclaimer

References

External links 

Living people
Year of birth missing (living people)
Place of birth missing (living people)
British make-up artists